Fly 6ix is a former passenger airline with its head office in Freetown, Sierra Leone, operating out of Lungi International Airport.

History
The airline was founded in 2010 by the UK-based MediCall Group of companies. Passenger flights commenced in January 2011. At the inauguration of passenger services, Ernest Koroma, President of Sierra Leone, officially designated Fly 6ix as the national carrier of Sierra Leone. Fly 6ix served four West African cities with a single Embraer 135 aircraft. The airline has ceased operating.  Fly6ix Limited resolved 3 December 2012 to be wound up voluntarily.

Former Destinations
The Spring 2011 schedule of Fly 6ix Airlines offers weekly connections between the following destinations along the Atlantic coast of West Africa:

Gambia
 Banjul - Banjul International Airport
Guinea
 Conakry - Conakry International Airport
Liberia
 Monrovia - Spriggs Payne Airport
Sierra Leone
 Freetown - Lungi International Airport

Fleet
As of May 2011, Fly 6ix Airline's scheduled operations were undertaken by a single Embraer 135. The aircraft, registered as 5Y-BVY, was originally delivered in 2003 to the American regional carrier Chautauqua Airlines.

References

External links
 

Defunct airlines of Sierra Leone
Airlines established in 2010
Airlines disestablished in 2012
Companies based in Freetown
2010 establishments in Sierra Leone